Marina Serova (born in 1966) is a former competitive figure skater for the Soviet Union. She is the 1981 World Junior silver medalist and a two-time Soviet national medalist. She was coached by Alexei Mishin. 

Serova married figure skater Yuri Bureiko and turned to coaching after retiring from competition. Based in Coventry, she has coached Jenna McCorkell, Elliot Hilton, David Richardson, and Phillip Harris.

Competitive highlights

References 

1966 births
Soviet female single skaters
Living people
World Junior Figure Skating Championships medalists
Figure skating coaches